A Matter of Resistance is a 1966 French romantic comedy film co-written and directed by Jean-Paul Rappeneau, and starring Catherine Deneuve, Pierre Brasseur, Philippe Noiret and Henri Garcin. It takes place in Normandy in 1944. It received the Louis Delluc Prize in 1965.

Cast
 Catherine Deneuve as Marie
 Philippe Noiret as Jérôme
 Pierre Brasseur as Dimanche
 Mary Marquet as Charlotte
 Henri Garcin as Julien
 Carlos Thompson as Klopstock
 Marc Dudicourt as Schimmelbeck
 Robert Moor as Plantier, the gardener
 Donald O'Brien as The American Officer  
 Jean-Pierre Moulin as Lieutenant
 Paul Le Person as Roger

References

External links
 
 
 
 

1966 films
French black-and-white films
1960s French-language films
1960s English-language films
1966 romantic comedy films
Films scored by Michel Legrand
French romantic comedy films
French war films
Films about the French Resistance
Films directed by Jean-Paul Rappeneau
Louis Delluc Prize winners
Films with screenplays by Jean-Paul Rappeneau
War romance films
1960s multilingual films
French multilingual films
1960s French films